Senator Rodgers may refer to:

Frank E. Rodgers (1909–2000), New Jersey State Senate
John S. Rodgers (born 1965), Vermont State Senate
Norman Rodgers (born 1927), Iowa State Senate
Samuel Rodgers (1894–1970), Northern Irish Senate
Samuel R. Rodgers (1798–1866), Tennessee State Senate

See also
Senator Rogers (disambiguation)